InConJunction is a fan-run, not-for-profit science fiction convention held during the first weekend in July in Indianapolis, Indiana. Past guests include Philip José Farmer, Frederik Pohl, Catherine Asaro, George R.R. Martin, Jerry Pournelle, Glen Cook, Mike Resnick, Timothy Zahn, and David Drake. The convention focuses on literature and literacy, but not to the exclusion of other areas of interest. Unique or unusual features include a dedicated Doctor Who room sponsored by The Whoosier Network, an anime room sponsored by The Indiana Animation Club, and a charity auction supporting Indy Reads and other charities as chosen by the convention chairperson.

Upcoming conventions

InConJunction XLI will be held 1–3 July 2022, at the Indianapolis Marriott East. Guests of Honor will be author Keith DeCandido; artist Ruth Thompson; and musician Marc Gunn.

Past conventions

InConJunction XL was held 2–4 July 2021, at the Indianapolis Marriott East. Since the COVID-19 pandemic caused 2020's cancellation, the event was deferred to the next year.

InConJunction XXXIX was held July 5–7, 2019, at the Indianapolis Marriott East. Guests of Honor were Jolly Blackburn, author, publisher and creator of the comic "Knights of the Dinner Table;" artist Terry Pavlet; musician and stand-up comic Mikey Mason; and cosplay performer and puppeteer Michael Parks, who with his wife, Shannon Parks, make appearances as Outcast Cosplay. Toastmaster was Indianapolis-based stage actor Doug Powers. The Author Guest of Honor was announced as Kilgore Trout, a science-fiction author character in the books of Kurt Vonnegut Jr., to promote convention events in cooperation with the Kurt Vonnegut Museum and Library, a beneficiary of the convention's charity efforts. Featured guests included Jammy Jo Eckhart, Lou Harry, Rob Pyatt Ph.D., playwright Casey Ross, improv comedy troupe Breakfast Anytime, and band The Shake Ups, which plays music from and inspired by children's cartoons. Ross also hosted an appearance by former arcade game record-holder Billy Mitchell.

InConJunction XXXVIII was held July 6–8, 2018, at the Indianapolis Marriott East. Author Guest of Honor was J.M. Lee. Artist Guest of Honor was Lee Cherolis. Comics Guest of Honor was Ed Cho, co-creator of "Little Guardians," with Cherolis. Cosplay Guest of Honor was Oriana Peron. Music Guest of Honor was the band The Yavin 4, which plays punk rock inspired by "Star Wars." Toastmaster was Lou Harry. Featured guests included Tammy Jo Eckhart and band The Shake Ups, which plays music from and inspired by children's cartoons.

InConJunction XXXVII was held June 30 – July 2, 2017, at the Indianapolis Marriott East. The author Guest of Honor was Mercedes Lackey. Artist Guest of Honor was Larry Dixon. Media Guest of Honor was actress, singer/songwriter, screenwriter, director and producer Shonna Bedford. Cosplay Guest of Honor was Michelle Mussoni, a/k/a Mogchelle. Science Guest of Honor was Kimberly Richey. Music Guest of Honor was Marc Gunn. Featured guests included Tammy Jo Eckhart, Kevin Harris, Lou Harry, Tom Smith, Bishop Stevens, and Bart Willard.

InConJunction XXXVI was held July 1 – 3, 2016, at the Indianapolis Marriott East. The Author Guest of Honor was Simon Morden (British author of The Metrozone series, Arcanum and more). The Media Guest of Honor was Rockne S. O'Bannon (television writer and producer of Farscape, seaQuest, Defiance, Cult, and Alien Nation). The Artist Guest of Honor was Heather V. Kreiter (Award-winning fantasy illustrator; creator of the My Little Demon series). The Music Guest of Honor was Wax Chaotic. The Featured Guests were Dr. Arlan K. Andrews, Sr., Keith DeCandido, Tammy Jo Eckhart, Michelle Mussoni, and Robert Pyatt, Ph. D.

InConJunction XXXV was held July 3 – 5, 2015, at the Indianapolis Marriott East. The Author Guests of Honor were Timothy Zahn and Dr. Arlan K. Andrews, Sr. The Artist Guest of Honor was RJ Haddy. The Music Guest of Honor was Marian Call. The Toastmaster was Lou Harry.

InConJunction XXXIV was held July 4 – 6, 2014, at the Indianapolis Marriott East. The Author Guest of Honor was to have been the late Aaron Allston. Upon his sudden death, the convention secured Jack Campbell (John G. Hemry) as Author Guest of Honor. The Artist Guest of Honor was Aaron Williams (cartoonist). The Science Guest of Honor was Robert Pyatt, PhD. The Toastmaster was Lou Harry.

InConJunction XXXIII was held July 5 – 7, 2013, at the Indianapolis Marriott East. The Author Guest of Honor was Cherie Priest. Artist Guest of Honor was Stuart Sayger. The Music Guest of Honor was the band Five Year Mission.

InConJunction XXXII was held July 6 – 8, 2012, at the Indianapolis Marriott East. The Author Guest of Honor was Kevin Hearne. Artist Guest of Honor was Paul "Pablo" Taylor. Fan Guest of Honor was Edward Endres, Jr.'s Fyberdyne Laboratories. Music Guest of Honor was the band Wild Mercy. And the Special Guest of Honor was prop builder Mike Moore.

InConJunction XXXI was held July 1 – 3, 2011, at the Indianapolis Marriott East. The Author Guest of Honor was Catherine Asaro. Artist Guest of Honor was David Lee Pancake. Music Guest of Honor was Donald Wolcott. Toastmaster was Travis Clemmons. Selected charities were One Laptop per Child and Indiana Literacy Association.

InConJunction 30 was held July 2 – 4, 2010, at the Indianapolis Marriott East. (The convention used "30" rather than XXX to avoid online misunderstandings.) Author Guest of Honor was Keith R. A. DeCandido. Artist Guest of Honor was Ed Beard, Jr. Gaming Guests of Honor were Andy Looney and Kristin Looney of Looney Labs. Music Guest was the band Wild Mercy. Toastmaster was The Incredible Two-Headed Toastmaster (Robert Pyatt and Randy Porter).

InConJunction XXIX was held July 3 – 5, 2009, at the Sheraton Indianapolis Hotel & Suites. Author Guests of Honor were Michael Z. Williamson and Sarah Zettel. Artist Guest of Honor was Robin Wood (artist). Toastmaster was Tom Smith.

InConJunction XXVIII was held July 4 – 6, 2008, at the Sheraton Indianapolis Hotel & Suites. Author Guest of Honor was John Scalzi. Artist Guests of Honor were Alan M. Clark and Howard Tayler. Fan Guest of Honor was Robert "Gunner" Reynolds. Toastmaster was Randy Porter.

InConJunction XXVII was held July 6 – 8, 2007, at the Sheraton Indianapolis Hotel & Suites. Author Guest of Honor was George R. R. Martin. Artist Guest of Honor was visual effects compositor Sherry Hitch. Fan Guests of Honor were Jeff Thompson and Kathie Thompson. Music Guests were The Gregory Morris Group and Tom Smith. Toastmaster was Randy Porter.

InConJunction XXVI was held July 7–9, 2006, at the Sheraton Indianapolis Hotel & Suites. Author Guest of Honor was Lori Skov-Jansen. Artist Guest of Honor was SFX props master Mike Moore. Music Guest of Honor was Tom Smith. Toastmaster was Rob Pyatt Ph.D. Fan Guests of Honor were Melissa Anelli, editorial director for Harry Potter fan site the-leaky-cauldron.org; and Emerson Spartz, creator of Mugglenet.com. Featured guests included Lou Harry, Steve Latshaw, Richard Propes, Mark Racop, Stuart Sayger, Michael West, Gary L. Wood, Indiana Ghost Trackers, Sinisterly Bad Theater and filk band Wild Mercy.

InConJunction XXV was held July 1–3, 2005, at the Sheraton Indianapolis Hotel & Suites. Author Guest of Honor was Tara K. Harper. Artist Guest of Honor was Aaron Williams. Music Guest of Honor was filker Tom Smith. Also listed as Guest of Honor was Alan Smithee, as there was a presentation regarding films using the name for the director. Toastmaster was Rob Pyatt Ph.D. Also listed as a guest was "Steve Godzilla," portrayed by a puppet.

Notes

References
Novello, Laura A (July 6, 1985). "Delegates universally way-out". Indianapolis Star.
Headden, Susan (July 5, 1986). "Searching for a truer 'fiction'". Indianapolis Star, pp. 25–26.

External links
InConJunction website
InConJunction History and Web Archive
InConJunction Twitter page
InConJunction Facebook page

Science fiction conventions in the United States
Festivals in Indianapolis